Doe Run Creek is a  long 1st order tributary to the Ararat River in Patrick County, Virginia.

Variant names
According to the Geographic Names Information System, it has also been known historically as:
Doe Run Baptist Church

Course
Doe Run Creek rises on the Johnson Creek divide about 2 miles west of the Groundhog Mountain peak in Patrick County.  Doe Run Creek then flows south to join the Ararat River about 1 mile northwest of The Hollow, Virginia.

Watershed
Doe Run Creek drains  of area, receives about 50.5 in/year of precipitation, has a wetness index of 307.61, and is about 73% forested.

See also
List of rivers of Virginia

References

Rivers of Virginia
Rivers of Patrick County, Virginia